Alf Steen Andersen (15 May 1906 – 12 April 1975) was a Norwegian ski jumper.
He was born in Drammen, but represented the Oslo clubs Sandaker, Skeid and Lyn. He won the gold medal in the individual large hill at the 1928 Winter Olympics in St. Moritz. He also won a bronze medal in the individual large hill at the 1935 FIS Nordic World Ski Championships in Vysoké Tatry.

He died in 1975 in Frogn.

References

1906 births
1975 deaths
Olympic ski jumpers of Norway
Olympic gold medalists for Norway
Ski jumpers at the 1928 Winter Olympics
Olympic medalists in ski jumping
FIS Nordic World Ski Championships medalists in ski jumping
Medalists at the 1928 Winter Olympics
Sportspeople from Drammen